is a Japanese footballer.

Club career statistics

References

External links

1983 births
Living people
Hosei University alumni
Association football people from Tokyo
People from Hachiōji, Tokyo
Japanese footballers
J1 League players
J2 League players
J3 League players
Tokyo Verdy players
FC Gifu players
SC Sagamihara players
Association football forwards